Albiac is a commune in the Haute-Garonne department in southwestern France.

Geography
The commune is bordered by five other communes: Loubens-Lauragais to the north, Le Faget to the east, La Salvetat-Lauragais to the southeast, Caraman to the south, and finally by Mascarville to the west.

Population

The inhabitants of the commune are known as Albiacois and Albiacoises.

See also
Communes of the Haute-Garonne department

References

Communes of Haute-Garonne